Crveni Koralji (trans. The Red Corals) were a Croatian and Yugoslav rock band formed in Zagreb in 1962. They were one of the pioneers of the Yugoslav rock scene.

Crveni Koralji were initially inspired by Cliff Richard and the Shadows, but soon included covers of songs by other foreign acts into their repertoire, as well as their own songs. With their performances and early releases, the band gained nationwide popularity, and by the mid-1960s, became the most popular Yugoslav rock group. At the end of the decade, with the arrival of new musical trends on the Yugoslav scene, their popularity heavily declined and the band disbanded in the mid-1970s. The band reunited in 1985, releasing three studio albums until the end of the decade. Since the beginning of the 1990s, the reunited band has performed only occasionally.

History

1962-1975
Crveni Koralji were formed in late 1962 by Boris Babarović (vocals), Miroslav Lukačić (guitar), Rudolf Šimunec (rhythm guitar), Dino Sarajlić (bass guitar) and Josip Badrić "Medo" (drums). Originally they wanted to name the band Crveni Đavoli (The Red Devils), but opted for another name, fearing that the name Crveni Đavoli might seem as a political provocation. The band had their debut performance on 29 March 1963 at the Zagreb club Varijete. Initially, they played covers of foreign hits, mostly of songs by Cliff Richard and the Shadows, performing mostly at dances at the Zagreb club Polet. The band got larger media attention after their performance at a concert at the Trade Union Hall in Belgrade, in which they performed alongside bands Bijele Strijele, Zlatni Dečaci and Elipse. Crveni Koralji started their performance with their backs turned to the audience, performing the song "Shadoogie". Until the end of the year, the band had several appearances on television and recorded the songs "Vinetu" ("Winnetou") and "Niz cestu" ("Down the Road") for Radio Zagreb.

In May 1964, Crveni Koralji performed at the Vatromet ritma (Fireworks of Rhythm) festival, held in Hall 3 of the Belgrade Fair, alongside Safiri, Nautilus, Zlatni Dečaci, Lutalice, Iskre, Elipse and Sadžo. This event is considered the first large rock concert held in Yugoslavia, with about 5,000 people attending. In July of the same year, they performed as a backing band for the popular singer Karlo Metikoš on his Yugoslav tour, playing 50 concerts. In October 1964, they performed at the third edition of Vatromet ritma, held at the Novi Sad Fair, alongside Faraoni, Elipse, Detlići and Siluete. That same year, the band released their debut record, the EP Najljepši san (The Most Beautiful Dream) through PGP-RTB. The EP featured The Shadows-inspired instrumentals "Najljepši san" and "Ponoć je prošla" ("Midnight Has Passed"), a cover of The Crystals' song "Then He Kissed Me" entitled "Dok je drugi ljubi" ("While Someone Else Is Kissing Her"), and the song "Rekla si: volimo se" ("You Said: We Love Each Other"), which became their first hit. The EP was sold in more than 100,000 copies; at the time, about 120,000 households in Yugoslavia owned a gramophone. The band achieved nationwide popularity, receiving thousands of fan letters from all over the country, and their performances and debut release were praised by the press.

In 1965, Crveni Koralji released their second EP, featuring the songs "Napuljska gitara" ("Naples Guitar"), which was a cover of an Italian folk song, "Maštanje" ("Imagination"), which was a cover of Cliff Richard and the Shadows' song "Don't Talk to Him", "Dolazak" ("The Coming"), which was a cover of Cliff Richard and the Shadows' song "Y' Arriva", and "Zvijezdana noć" ("Starry Night"), which was a cover of The Shadows' song "Cosy". During the year, they released their third EP, Otiđi od nje (Leave Her). The title track was a cover of Arthur Alexander's song "You Better Move On". The EP also featured the songs "Svega mi je dosta" ("I Had Enough"), a cover of The Valentinos' "It's All Over Now", and two instrumental tracks, "Tema mladih ljubavnika", a cover of The Shadows' "Theme for Young Lovers", and a cover of The Shadows' version of Alberto Domínguez's composition "Perfidia". The band's fourth EP, released in 1966, featured two songs authored by the band, "Sretne godine" ("Happy Years") and "Izgubljenoj ljubavi" ("To the Lost Love"), alongside a cover of The Beatles' song "And I Love Her" entitled "Volim je" ("I Love Her"), and a cover of The Spotnicks' version of the composition "Johnny Guitar". During the year, the band appeared at the Zagreb Music Festival with the songs "Pismo" ("Letter") and "Cipele stare, cipele nove" ("Old Shoes, New Shoes"), winning the Second Prize for Composition and the First Prize for Lyrics.

With a series of hits, the band rose to the status of being the most popular Yugoslav rock band. They won several awards at Yugoslav music festivals and were proclaimed the Best Yugoslav Band by the music magazine Ritam for three years in a row. After The Shadows' performance at the Split Music Festival, Crveni Koralji had a joint club performance with them. They played as a studio band on records of popular singers like Karlo Metikoš, Ivica Šerfezi, Zdenka Vučković, Gabi Novak, Ivo Robić, Đorđe Marjanović, and others. In July 1966, they won first place at the International Beat Festival, organized in Zagreb and featuring Yugoslav and Italian bands. In August, the band went to West Germany, where they spent seven months performing in clubs in Darmstadt, Dortmund, Nuremberg and Frankfurt. After their return to Yugoslavia, they won first place at the Zagreb Music Festival with the song "Ne pitajte za nju" ("Don't Ask Me About Her").

In 1967, under the name Red Corals, they released a split 7" single with the Zagreb band Delfini for the Benelux market through Belgian record label Benelux International. The single featured the Crveni Koralji song "Napoli Guitar". However, by this period, their popularity in Yugoslavia started to decline, and the band started going through lineup changes. In 1967, Sarajlić left the band and the group's new bass guitarist was Mika Hižak, a former member of the band Kon-Tiki. Soon after, Badrić had to leave the band due to his mandatory stint in the Yugoslav army. The band held a farewell concert for Badrić at the Varijete club, with Džentlmeni as the supporting act. Boris Turina became the band's new drummer. The first record released by the new lineup was the EP Sam (Alone), released in 1968. The EP brought the hit "Da sam drvosječa", a cover of the Tim Hardin song "If I Were a Carpenter". Despite the success of the EP, part of the press criticized the band's sound as archaic. On 3 September 1968, the band appeared at the first edition of the Festival of Yugoslav Pop Music in Zagreb. The audience put their song "Moja gitara" ("My Guitar") in first place and their song "Noćas sam sanjao" ("I Dreamt Last Night") in fourth, and the jury awarded them with the Best Performance Award. Both songs were released on their following EP, Moja gitara.

In 1969, Babarović left the band. He appeared at the 1969 Subotica Youth Festival as a solo artist, performing the songs "Nikad neću biti sretan" ("I'll Never Be Happy") and "Svjetlost" ("The Light"). During the same year, he released the solo EP Dvije čaše (Two Glasses), featuring four songs written by Alfons Vučer. Soon after, Rudi Šimunec also left. Wanting to turn towards a more contemporary sound, the remaining members hired an organist, former Bardi (The Bards) member Boris Kajzer. After a short tour across West Germany, the band released their 7" single featuring the songs "Bez djevojke" ("Without a Girl") and "Još uvijek se nadam" ("I Still Have Hope"), featuring Hižak on vocals. In October 1969, Badrić returned from the army and rejoined the band, Turina thus leaving the group; Turina would later form the band Drugi Način with former members of Novi Akordi (The New Chords). Badrić managed to persuade Babarović, who was disappointed with the poor reception of his solo EP, to return to the band. Kajzer was replaced by Alfons Vučer, who was already an established pop composer. In 1970, there was a new lineup change: Vučer and Hižak left the band, and were replaced by organist Krešo Pavlić and bass guitarist Vlado Bastajić, a former member of Grešnici. However, at this point, due to the growing popularity of Yugoslav progressive rock bands, Crveni Koralji's popularity and the media's interest for the band were very low, so Babarović once again left the band. He moved to Split, where he formed the band ZiS (short for Zagreb i Split, Zagreb and Split). Crveni Koralji released several more singles, but failed to make a comeback in popularity, disbanding in the mid-1970s.

1985-1989
The band reunited in 1985, with a lineup that featured Boris Babarović (vocals), Miroslav Lukačić (guitar), Krešo Pavlić (keyboards), Rudolf Šimunec (bass guitar) and a new member, Željko Marinac (drums). They started performing regularly at the Zagreb kafana Čarda, and in 1985, they released the LP Rock 'n' roll zbirka (1963-1966) (Rock 'n' roll Collection (1963-1966)), which was Crveni Koralji's first full length album. For the album, the band rerecorded most of the songs released in the 1963-1966 period. In 1986, they released the album Najbolje izvedbe (Best Performances), which featured their own songs, as well as covers of songs by Creedence Clearwater Revival, the Bee Gees and other acts. In 1986, they also appeared at the MESAM festival with the song "Rajka", which was released on the festival's official compilation album MESAM 86. The band marked its 25th anniversary with the album Ja sam tvoj čovjek (I'm Your Man). The album was released under the moniker Boris Babarović & Crveni Koralji. Besides their own songs, some of them co-written with Neki To Vole Vruće member Silvestar Dragoj, the album also featured a cover of Ritchie Valens' song "Donna" and The Beatles' song "And I Love Her".

1990s and 2000s
During the following two decades, the band would occasionally reunite to perform live. In 2002, in order to mark the band's 40th anniversary, Babarović rerecorded some of the band's own songs, releasing them under the name Boris Babarović Barba & Crveni Koralji on the album Prvih 40 godina (The First 40 Years).

Discography

Studio albums
Rock 'n' roll zbirka (1963-1966) (1985)
Najbolje izvedbe (1986)
Ja sam tvoj čovjek (1988)
Prvih 40 godina (2002)

EPs
Najljepši san (1964)
Napuljska gitara (1965)
Otiđi od nje (1965)
Volim je (1966)
Sam (1968)
Moja gitara (1969)
Vrati mi se (1971)

Compilation albums
Prvih 30 godina (1994)
S vama u 3. millennium (1999)
The Ultimate Collection (2008)
Greatest Hits Collection (2018)

Singles
"Bez djevojke" / "Još uvijek se nadam (1969)
"Mnogo značiš za moj život, draga" / "Dvije čaše" (1970)
"Nikad nisam imao ništa" / "Pogrešan broj" (1970)
"Šjor Bepo moj" / "Na brigu kuća mala" (1972)
"Neka život teče" / "Vizija" (1972)
"Za svaki dan" / "Nemoj poći kući" (1973)
"Elvira" / "Tvoj strani svijet" (1974)

Other appearances
"Rajka" (MESAM 86, 1986)

References

External links 
 Crveni Koralji at Discogs

Croatian rock music groups
Yugoslav rock music groups
Instrumental rock musical groups
Beat groups
Musical groups established in 1962
Musical groups disestablished in 1975
Musical groups reestablished in 1985